Catford railway station is one of two stations serving the London suburb of Catford. Connections to London Victoria are available at Peckham Rye. Catford is  measured from Victoria.

It is adjacent to, and on a higher level than, Catford Bridge railway station on the Mid-Kent Line. The two stations are separated by the site of the former Catford Stadium. Interchange on one ticket is allowed between the two stations.

There is only a small shelter, a ticket machine, a few lamp-posts and a stairway on each of the two otherwise bare platforms, unlike the more ornate Catford Bridge station, which has retained most of its original architecture. Each platform has customer information screens.

Services

All services at Catford are operated by Thameslink using Class 700 EMUs.

The typical off-peak service in trains per hour is:

 2 tph to London Blackfriars
 2 tph to  via 

In addition, the service to London Blackfriars is extended to and from  via .

1945 derailment
On 23 September 1945, a Victoria to Ramsgate train derailed on its approach to the station, much of it falling down the embankment towards Catford Stadium. One passenger was killed, and many others were injured (the train had been carrying 377 passengers). The enquiry concluded that it was probably caused by an unnoticed track defect that perhaps arose from heavy rainfall in the preceding days.

In the media 
The second episode of the 1979 London Weekend Television comedy series End of Part One includes the main characters watching a film called "The Life of Christopher Columbus". In the film, Columbus goes to a tube station and asks for a train to America, but is told he can only go as far as Catford. Part of a modified tube map is shown with the fictitious tube stations Lewisham, Ladywell, Edge of the World and Catford on the East London section of the Metropolitan line south from New Cross tube station. This is based on the main line railway line serving Catford Bridge railway station.

Connections
London Buses routes 75, 124, 171, 181, 185, 202, 284 and night route N171 serve the station.

References

External links 

Railway stations in the London Borough of Lewisham
Former London, Chatham and Dover Railway stations
Railway stations in Great Britain opened in 1892
Catford
Railway stations served by Govia Thameslink Railway